Excel is a crossover thrash band from Venice, California, founded in 1983 by singer Dan Clements and guitarist Adam Siegel. They were influenced by 1970s punk rock musicians like the Germs and Black Flag, and heavy metal bands like Black Sabbath, Trouble, Slayer, Corrosion of Conformity and Cryptic Slaughter. They were also influenced by street art, Excel is known for painting graffiti on the streets of the cities where they make their tours, hence there are many different logos of the band.

Excel came out of the West Side Los Angeles crossover thrash scene as did many others in California like No Mercy, Beowülf, Suicidal Tendencies and Cryptic Slaughter, and sometimes with other performers on the thrash metal scene like Testament, Overkill and Megadeth.

Excel has recorded three studio albums, three split albums, five demos, three singles and two live albums; the band broke up in 1995 but in 2001 they released new versions of their first two albums: Split Image and The Joke's on You, with some bonus tracks. In August 2009 they edited a special collection of eight DVDs of their tours around Europe and Los Angeles and published them on their official MySpace. As of January 2012, Excel has re-formed.

History

The band formed in 1983 under the name Chaotic Noise (created by Dan Clements and Adam Siegel). Then Evan Warech joined as drummer, while the bass was occupied by a lot of different musicians that year (Dan Clements said: "We had a different bassist every four months, and people just figured we were unstable"). In 1984 Rickey Pallamino took over the four strings; with the lineup finally completed, they recorded their first Demo. In 1985 Warech and Pallamino left the band; the latter was replaced by Shaun Ross, who created the name "Excel" with his friends from the LA graffiti crew KSN (Kings Stop at Nothing), then they changed their name.

A few months later a new drummer joined Excel: Greg Saenz. Excel participated in the compilation Welcome to Venice (released by Suicidal Records) which includes three of their songs. In the next few months they recorded three demos:Sonic Decapitation in February 1985, Personal Onslaught June 9 and Refuse to Quit in January 1986. In 1987 they participated in the tape Thrasher Skate Rock 5: Born to Skate which included their song "Insecurity"; also recorded on their first studio album, Split Image (recorded by Suicidal Records and released by Caroline Records), released in July the same year. Excel had performed live in L.A. in recent years, but the June 16, 1987, they gave their first official concert in the "Fender's Grand Ballroom" of Long Beach, California, and a second time March 18, 1988, to promote their new album. Later that year, they edited their first single, a cover of the song Message in a bottle originally released by The Police in the album Regatta de Blanc in September 1979. In early 1989, Excel recorded another single, "Blaze some Hate", to promote their second studio album: The Joke's on You, released June 20, 1989, by Caroline Records. In march the band made a show at "Chuck Landis' Country Club" in Reseda California and the "Palasades Theater" in San Diego (with the band B'LAST!). In November, Excel made their first tour, which was made in Netherlands in the cities of: Sneek, Heemskerk, Eindhoven, Rotterdam, Goes and Den Bosch.

On their return to United States, Excel played at "The Palace" in Hollywood, California, the Star Club in Ybor City, Florida, and Philadelphia April 29, 1990. Then Adam Siegel joined the ranks of Infectious Grooves to record the album The Plague That Makes Your Booty Move...It's the Infectious Grooves in 1991; he got back in 1992 to play at the "Whisky a Go Go" in Hollywood. A few months later they recorded their fifth demo: Third album demos; the songs of this demo were used later in the reissue of The Joke's on You.

Also in 1991, Excel piqued interest in taking legal action against thrash metal band Metallica over the song "Enter Sandman", which they claim borrows heavily from Excel's song "Tapping into the Emotional Void", originally included on The Joke's on You LP, released in 1989, two years before the release of Metallica's Black Album (it was most recently echoed by Megadeth frontman Dave Mustaine in an interview), but nothing moved forward due to improper legal counsel.

In 1993, Siegel returned to Infectious Grooves to record the album Sarsippius' Ark on February 16 of the same year; then he and Greg Saenz got together to form the power trio My Head, leaving Excel definitely. After three years of silence, with Brandon Rudley, from the San Fernando Valley metal band Immorally Demonic, on guitar and Max Asher (listed on credits as "Max") on drums, Excel returned with a new stoner metal style to record a new split album with the band Shrine. They recorded their last single to promote their third studio album: Seeking Refuge, released August 29, 1995. After releasing the album Clements was unable to find a replacement for Max Asher on drums, preventing the band from playing live shows. Vic Caruso joined Excel as drummer and toured with the band in support of the album, playing at the "Board in Orange County" festival at the CSU Dominguez Hills Velodrome in Carson, CA in May 1995. Caruso can be seen playing drums in the music video for "Unenslaved". The band toured the US, headlining shows and also opening for bands such as Marilyn Manson. In 2000, Rudley died from a brain aneurysm at the age of 25, and Excel was officially disbanded a few months later.

In May 2006, singer Dan Clements joined forces with original Suicidal Tendencies members Grant Estes (guitar), Amery Smith (drums) and Louiche Mayorga (bass) and the former No Mercy Kevin Guercio (vocals) to form the band Against to record two tracks for a new split album called Welcome 2 Venice. After the release of the album there were rumors about a possible Excel reunion, however Clements said he had no intentions of re-forming the band and did not want anyone to take Against as a return of the group.

Excel announced their reunion in January 2012. Involved in the reunion include Dan Clements on vocals, Shaun Ross on bass and Greg Saenz on drums; Adam Siegel was asked to participate but he declined the offer. Alex Barreto, a long time friend of the band, replaced Siegel on guitar. On March 30, 2013, Excel played their first reunion at a private party at RVCA in Los Angeles, California.

Excel is still active as of 2019, and they perform shows occasionally, mostly around the areas of Southern California. The band has also been reportedly working on new music.

Members

Current lineup
 Dan Clements – lead vocals (1983–1995, 2012–present)
 Alex Barreto – guitar (2012–present)
 Shaun Ross – bass guitar (1985–1995, 2012–present)
 Greg Saenz – drums (1985–1992, 2012–2014, 2016–present)

Former members
 Adam Siegel – guitar (1983–1992)
 Evan Warech – drums (1983–1985)
 Rickey Pallamino – bass guitar (1984–1985)
 Brandon Rudley – guitar (1995)
 Max Asher – drums (1995)
 Michael Cosgrove – drums (2014–2016)

Timeline

Discography

Studio albums

Live albums
All live albums are self-produced

Split albums

DVDs
All DVDs are self-produced and were released in August 2009

Demos
All demos are self-produced

Singles

References

External links
 

 
Crossover thrash groups
Musical groups established in 1983
Musical groups disestablished in 1995
Thrash metal musical groups from California
Musical quartets
Musical groups from Los Angeles